Zeta Virginis (ζ Virginis, abbreviated Zeta Vir, ζ Vir) is a binary star in the zodiac constellation of Virgo. It is visible to the naked eye with an apparent visual magnitude of +3.376 and is located about a half degree south of the celestial equator. Based on parallax measurements obtained during the Hipparcos mission, it is about  distant from the Sun.

The two components are designated Zeta Virginis A (officially named Heze , a mid-20th-century name for the system) and B.

Nomenclature 

ζ Virginis (Latinised to Zeta Virginis) is the system's Bayer designation. The designations of the two components as Zeta Virginis A and B derive from the convention used by the Washington Multiplicity Catalog (WMC) for multiple star systems, and adopted by the International Astronomical Union (IAU).

Zeta Virginis bore the name Heze in a 1951 publication, Atlas Coeli (Skalnate Pleso Atlas of the Heavens), by Czech astronomer Antonín Bečvář. Its origin is unknown. In 2016, the IAU organized a Working Group on Star Names (WGSN) to catalog and standardize proper names for stars. The WGSN decided to attribute proper names to individual stars rather than entire multiple systems. It approved the name Heze for the component Zeta Virginis A on 1 June 2018 and it is now so included in the List of IAU-approved Star Names.

Properties 

The primary, ζ Virginis A, is a main sequence star with a spectral class A3 V, indicating that it is generating energy through the nuclear fusion of hydrogen at its core. This energy is being radiated from its outer envelope at an effective temperature of 8,247 K, giving it the white hue of an A-type star. It has twice the mass of the Sun and double the Sun's radius and is about a half billion years old.

The star was confirmed by Jan Ovidiu Tercu and Gabriel Cristian Neagu as a variable of DSCT type. The variability has an amplitude of 0.009 magnitudes and a main period of 0.097112 d. Other observed periods are 0.439, 1.069, 0.07691 and 0.07433 d. The variability was discovered during the datamining activity with the goal of increasing the student's investigative competences.

In 2010, a low mass stellar companion was discovered - Zeta Virginis B. Though it has not been under observation for a sufficient length of time to determine accurate orbital elements, it is estimated to be orbiting at an average separation of at least 24.9 AU with an orbital eccentricity of 0.16 or more and orbital period of a minimum of 124 years. This companion may be a red dwarf star, which would explain the observed X-ray flux from this system.

References

External links
Boyajian, Tabetha S. et al., 2012. Stellar Diameters and Temperatures. I. Main-sequence A, F, and G Stars. The Astrophysical Journal vol 746 (1) p. 101  

Virginis, Zeta
Virgo (constellation)
A-type main-sequence stars
Heze
Virginis, 079
066249
5107
118098
3792
Durchmusterung objects
Binary stars